Arthrobacter echini is a Gram-positive, strictly aerobic and non-motile bacterium species from the genus Arthrobacter which has been isolated from the gut of the sea urchin Heliocidaris crassispina from Dokdo island, Korea.

References

External links 

Type strain of Arthrobacter echini at BacDive -  the Bacterial Diversity Metadatabase

Bacteria described in 2016
Micrococcaceae